District School No. 1, also known as Cedar Hill Schoolhouse, is a historic school building located in the Town of Bethlehem in Albany County, New York south of the capital.  It was built in 1859 and expanded in 1907. It is a one-story, rectangular brick building, seven bays by three bays in the Italianate style with later Neoclassical details. It features an elaborate domed cupola. School use ceased in 1962.  Since 1965 it has housed the Bethlehem Historical Society and museum.

It was listed on the National Register of Historic Places in 1998.

References

History museums in New York (state)
Public high schools in Albany County, New York
School buildings completed in 1859
School buildings on the National Register of Historic Places in New York (state)
National Register of Historic Places in Albany County, New York